The Donald Windham Sandy M. Campbell Literature Prizes is an American literary award which offers prizes in four categories: fiction, nonfiction, poetry and drama. The award was established at Yale University in 2011 with the first prizes presented in 2013. Administered by the Beinecke Rare Book & Manuscript Library, the award recognizes English language writers from anywhere in the world. The mission of the award is to call attention to literary achievement and provide writers the opportunity to focus on their work independent of financial concerns. Eight prizes are awarded annually. 

Winners receive a citation and an unrestricted remuneration of $165,000. The individual prizes are among the richest literary prize amounts in the world, if not the richest in certain categories. The award is endowed from the combined estates of writer Donald Windham and actor Sandy Campbell. Campbell was Windham's companion of 45 years, and when Campbell died in 1988 he left his estate to Windham with the understanding a literary award would be created from the combined estate after Windham's death. Windham died in 2010, and in 2011 Yale announced they would become administrators of the new award. The inaugural winners were announced in March 2013.

Recipients

Notes

References

External links

Awards established in 2011
American fiction awards
American non-fiction literary awards
Dramatist and playwright awards
English-language literary awards
Awards and prizes of Yale University
Yale University Library
2011 establishments in the United States